Out of Tune may refer to:

 Out of Tune (album), by Mojave 3
 Out of Tune (band)
 "Out of Tune", a song by A from How Ace Are Buildings
 Out of Tune (TV series)
 Musical tuning